Jeux sans frontières was a Europe-wide television game show. The 1993 edition was won by the team from Kecskemét in Hungary.

Participating countries

Heats

Heat 1 - Rhyl, Wales

Heat 2 - Passariano, Italy

Heat 3 - Loèche-les-Bains, Switzerland

Heat 4 - Amarousion, Greece

Heat 5 - Coimbra, Portugal

Heat 6 - Rhyl, Wales

Heat 7 - Passariano, Italy

Heat 8 - Loèche-les-Bains, Switzerland

Heat 9 - Coimbra, Portugal

Heat 10 - Kecskemét, Hungary

Final 
The final round was held in Karlovy Vary, Czech Republic

Qualifying teams 
The teams which qualified from each country to the final were:

Results

Jeux sans frontières
1993 television seasons
Television game shows with incorrect disambiguation